Bloat may refer to:

Biology and medicine
 Bloat (canine) (gastric dilatation volvulus), an overstretched and rotated stomach in dogs 
 Bloat (ruminant) (ruminal tympany), an excessive volume of gas in ruminants
 Bloating, an abnormal swelling or enlargement of the abdomen
 Gas bloat syndrome, a complication of Nissen fundoplication surgery

Computing
 Code bloat, computer code that is unnecessarily long, slow, or wasteful of resources
 Software bloat, uncontrolled and damaging growth of a software system through successive versions

Other uses
 Bloat (Wild Cards), a character in the Wild Cards book series
 Bloat, a pufferfish and the character in the Finding Nemo franchise